Corridor is the eighteenth studio album by Japanese pop singer Miki Imai, released on November 25, 2009. It is her first studio album in 3 years. It debuted at #61 on the weekly Oricon albums chart with 2,926 units sold.

Track listing

Charts and sales

References

External links
 

2009 albums
Miki Imai (singer) albums